The 120 members of the sixteenth Knesset were elected on 28 January 2003. The breakdown by party was as follows:

Likud: 38
Labor Party-Meimad: 19
Shinui: 15
Shas: 11
National Union: 7
Meretz-Yachad and the Democratic Choice: 6
National Religious Party: 6
United Torah Judaism: 5
Hadash-Ta'al: 3
One Nation: 3
Balad: 3
Yisrael BaAliyah: 2
United Arab List: 2

List of members

Replacements

External links
Knesset members in the Sixteenth Knesset Knesset website

 
16